The Hyundai Lafesta is compact sedan manufactured by Hyundai through its Beijing Hyundai joint venture in China since 2018. It sits between the Hyundai Elantra and Hyundai Sonata in Hyundai's Chinese vehicle lineup.

Overview

The Hyundai Lafesta was first revealed at the 2018 Beijing Auto Show and was launched in the Chinese market in October 2018 with prices ranging from 119,800 to 145,800 yuan.

Lafesta EV
A battery-electric version "Lafesta EV" was announced to be available in China starting in December 2019. It is promised with  NEDC range of  electric motor,  top speed. It is slightly longer due to a new front with a more streamlined nose and slightly higher due to the necessary space for the battery. The battery cells are to be provided by CATL.

Engines
The Lafesta is available with two engine options.

References

External links
 -Official Website

Lafesta
Mid-size cars
Sedans
Front-wheel-drive vehicles
Cars introduced in 2018
Cars of China
2020s cars
Production electric cars